= Murder in Washington, D.C., law =

Murder in Washington, D.C., law constitutes the unlawful killing of a human being with malice aforethought within the jurisdiction of the District of Columbia. The District of Columbia, unlike U.S. states, is a federal district with its own criminal code. Murder is generally classified into first and second degree, with various penalty ranges determined by the District of Columbia Official Code.

== Definitions ==
In the District of Columbia, first degree murder typically involves premeditation or the commission of certain felonies, while all other intentional, unjustified killings are classified as second degree murder. Both are felony offenses that carry severe penalties. The District of Columbia abolished the death penalty in 1981, and it is no longer available as a sentencing option.

== Penalties ==
Under current law, the court may impose substantial prison sentences for murder convictions. Generally:

- First degree murder: A prison sentence up to 60 years.
- Second degree murder: A prison sentence up to 40 years.

If certain procedural requirements are met by the prosecution and an “aggravating factor” is found, the court may impose a prison sentence that exceeds these normal maximums. For example:

- First degree murder or first degree murder while armed: A sentence exceeding 60 years.
- Second degree murder while armed: A sentence exceeding 40 years.

In cases involving the murder of a police officer, the court may impose a sentence of life without the possibility of release.

Offense	Sentencing range
Second degree murder	Any term of years, but no more than 40 years (unless there are aggravating circumstances), or life without parole
First degree murder	30–60 years (sentence can exceed 60 years if there are aggravating circumstances) or life without parole
Murder of a law enforcement officer	Life without parole (if the defendant was a juvenile, a judge sets a term of 60 years)

== Statistics ==
Official crime statistics concerning murder in the District of Columbia are compiled and published by local and federal agencies. These agencies track trends, clearance rates, and the demographic data of victims and perpetrators.
